Nationality words link to articles with information on the nation's poetry or literature (for instance, Irish or France).

Events

 March 5: a car bomb was exploded on Mutanabbi Street in Baghdad. More than 30 people were killed and more than 100 were wounded. This locale is the historic center of Baghdad bookselling, a winding street filled with bookstores and outdoor book stalls. Named after the famed 10th century classical Arab poet, Al-Mutanabbi, it was an established street for bookselling for hundreds of years and the heart and soul of the Baghdad literary and intellectual community. On March 8, to remember the tragic event, Baghdad poets presented readings on the remains of the street. This was followed by various poetry readings around the United States commemorating the bombing of the historic center of the literary and intellectual community of Baghdad, many of the readings took place in the final weeks of August 2007.
 April 17: Nikki Giovanni, a professor of English at the Virginia Polytechnic Institute and State University in the US state of Virginia, both spoke and recited poetry at the campus convocation commemorating the Virginia Tech massacre of the day before. Giovanni taught the Virginia Tech shooter Seung-Hui Cho in a poetry class. She had previously approached the department chair to have Cho taken out of her class. "We are the Hokies! We will prevail! We will prevail! We are Virginia Tech!" Giovanni said, bringing the audience to its feet and into a spontaneous cheer. Giovanni closed the ceremony with a chant poem, intoning, "We are sad today, and we will be sad for quite a while. We are not moving on. We are embracing our mourning. We are Virginia Tech... We do not understand this tragedy... No one deserves a tragedy."
 August 9:  Bangladeshi poet Taslima Nasreen was attacked at a book signing in the Indian state of Andhra Pradesh by a crowd of protesters who shouted for her death. The attackers consisted of lawmakers and members of the All India Majlis-e-Ittehadul Muslimeen party who objected to her writings on religion and oppression of women. After the attack, India criminally charged Nasreen with "hurting Muslim feelings", punishable by up to three years in jail.
 The New Yorker magazine announced that longtime poetry editor Alice Quinn was leaving and, as of November, Paul Muldoon, an Irish native and U.S. citizen, would be taking over what The Chronicle of Higher Education called "one of the most powerful positions in American poetry".
 Scottish poet Alastair Reid read his poem "Scotland" publicly for the last time at a literary festival in St Andrews, then burned the manuscript.
 The Eagles set "An Old-Fashioned Song", a poem by John Hollander, to music (four-part harmony with guitar chords, but mostly singing it a cappella), named it "No More Walks in the Wood" after its first line. They released it on the album, "Long Road Out of Eden". The band added no words to the 21-line poem, and there are no choruses.
 In Russia, the expert board for the Bunin Prize for poetry dissolved itself amid reports of interference and pressure from sponsors. A new expert board was formed and the jury awarded the prize to Andrei Dementyev.
 Reality television contest Prince of Poets is launched in the United Arab Emirates.

Works published in English
Listed by nation where the work was first published and again by the poet's native land, if different; substantially revised works listed separately:

Australia

 Judith Bishop, Event
 David Brooks, Urban Elegies. Sydney: Island Press (Australia)
 Lisa Gorton, Press Release
 Kathryn Lomer, Two Kinds of Silence, University of Queensland Press, 
 David Malouf, Typewriter Music, winner of the 2008 Arts Queensland Judith Wright Calanthe Award
 Les Murray, Selected Poems (Black Inc.) 
 Dorothy Porter, El Dorado
 Peter Skrznecki, Old/New World, University of Queensland Press, 
 Rob Walker, "phobiaphobia" (Picaro Press) 
 Petra White, The Incoming Tide

Australian anthologies
 Peter Rose, The Best Australian Poems 2007, Black Inc.,

Poets in Best Australian Poetry 2007
The Best Australian Poetry 2007, by series editors Bronwyn Lea and Martin Duwell; with 2007 guest editor John Tranter (University of Queensland Press), published work by these 40 poets:

 Robert Adamson
 Judith Bishop
 Pam Brown
 Joanne Burns
 Grant Caldwell
 Chris Edwards
 Michael Farrell
 Barbara Fisher
 Dennis Foley
 Alison Gerber

 Jennifer Harrison
 Dominique Hecq
 Matt Hetherington
 Charles Higham
 Clive James
 Mary Jenkins
 Jill Jones
 S. K. Kelen
 Cath Kenneally
 John Kinsella

 Cameron Lowe
 David McCooey
 Jennifer Maiden
 Graeme Miles
 John Millett
 Pooja Mittal
 Reg Mombassa
 Les Murray
 Louise Nicholas
 Ouyang Yu

 Geoff Page
 Megan Petrie
 Craig Powell
 Michael Riley
 Peter Rose
 Brendan Ryan
 Tracy Ryan
 Michael Sharkey
 Chris Wallace-Crabbe
 Dennis Wild

Canada
 Joanne Arnott, Mother Time
 Margaret Atwood, The Door
 Yvonne Blomer, A Broken Mirror, Fallen Leaf
 Nicole Brossard, Notebook of Roses and Civilization, translated by Erin Moure (Coach House Books) 
 Lorna Crozier, The Blue Hour of the Day
 Don Domanski, All Our Wonder Unavenged (Brick Books), winner of the Governor General's Book Award
 Patrick Friesen, Earth's Crude Gravities
 Paul Haines, edited by Stuart Broomer, Secret Carnival Workers (Coach House Books) 
 Brian Henderson, Nerve Language
 Sarah Lang, Work of Days (Coach House Books) 
 Dennis Lee:
 The Bard of the Universe. Kentville, NS: Gaspereau Press.
 Yesno. Toronto: Anansi.
 David McGimpsey, Sitcom (Coach House Books) 
 George McWhirter, The Incorrection
 Garry Thomas Morse, Streams
 Erín Moure, O Cadoiro
 George Murray The Rush to Here, 
 bpNichol, edited by Lori Emerson and Darren Wershler-Henry, Alphabet Game: A bpNichol Reader (Coach House Books) 
 Barbara Nickel, Domain
 Elizabeth Philips, Torch River
 Anne Simpson Quick, 
 Agnes Walsh, Going Around with Bachelors
 Rob Winger, Muybridge's Horse
 Rachel Zolf, Human Resources (Coach House Books)

India, in English
 Dilip Chitre, As Is, Where Is, ( Poetry in English ), Mumbai:Poetrywala; India,
 Dilip Sankarreddy, Wanderings with Poetry, Peacock Books, India
 C. P. Surendran,  Portraits of the Space We Occupy (Poetry in English), New Delhi: Harper Collins, India
 Tapan Kumar Pradhan, Kalahandi, New Delhi : Sahitya Akademi

Anthologies in India
 Jeet Thayil : 60 Indian Poets : 1952-2007, New Delhi : Penguin India

Ireland
 Pat Boran, New and Selected Poems Dedalus Press, Ireland
 Patrick Cotter general editor, Colm Breathnach and Maurice Riordan 2007 editors, The Best of Irish Poetry 2007 designed to be the first of an annual series.
 Paul Durcan, The Laughter of Mothers, (Harvill Secker)
 Peter Fallon, The Company of Horses, Oldcastle: The Gallery Press, 
 Thomas McCarthy and Bríd Ní Bhóráin, editors, Best of Irish Poetry 2008, selections from 50 Irish poets published over a 12-month period, including Ciaran Carson, Harry Clifton, Kerry Hardie, Seamus Heaney, Biddy Jenkinson, Thomas Kinsella, Medbh McGuckian, Paula Meehan, John Montague, Bernard O'Donoghue, Robert Nye, Dennis O'Driscoll, Leanne O'Sullivan, Maurice Riordan, Billy Ramsell, David Wheatley, Liam Ó Muirthile, Celia de Fréine, Cathal Ó Searcaigh, William Wall, published October 2007 (Southword Editions)  (anthology)
 Maurice Riordan, The Holy Land London: Faber and Faber, Irish poet living in and published in the United Kingdom

New Zealand
 Janet Charman, Cold Snack, Auckland: Auckland University Press
 Andrew Johnston, Sol
 Michele Leggott, Journey to Portugal (Holloway Press) a collection of poems written during a 2004 trip to Portugal and inspired by Fernando Pessoa, Portugal's great Modernist poet. Illustrated by Gretchen Albrecht.
 Paula Green, Making Lists for Francis Hodgkins, Auckland University Press
 Kay McKenzie Cooke, Made for Weather: Poems by Kay McKenzie Cooke, Otago University Press
 Jessica Le Bas, Incognito, Auckland University Press

Poets in Best New Zealand Poems
These poets wrote the 25 poems selected for Best New Zealand Poems 2006, published this year:

 Hinemoana Baker
 Cherie Barford
 Jenny Bornholdt
 James Brown
 Alistair Te Ariki Campbell

 Geoff Cochrane
 Murray Edmond
 David Eggleton
 Cliff Fell
 Brian Flaherty

 Paula Green
 Bernadette Hall
 Anna Jackson
 Andrew Johnston
 Michele Leggott

 Selina Tusitala Marsh
 Karlo Mila
 Gregory O'Brien
 Brian Potiki
 Chris Price

 Elizabeth Smither
 C. K. Stead
 JC Sturm
 Richard von Sturmer
 Alison Wong

United Kingdom

 Simon Armitage, translator, Sir Gawain and the Green Knight: A New Verse Translation, Faber and Faber
 W. H. Auden, Collected Poems, edited by Edward Mendelson (Modern Library) (Anglo-American poet), posthumous
 Dale Craske Remedy The Remedy With New Improved Remedy, Faber
 Carol Ann Duffy:
 Editor, Answering Back, Picador (anthology)
 The Hat, Faber and Faber (children's poetry)
 Ian Duhig, The Speed of Dark (Picador), on the short list for the T. S. Eliot Prize
 Alan Gillis, Hawks and Doves (Gallery), on the short list for the T. S. Eliot Prize
 Sophie Hannah, Pessimism for Beginners (Carcanet), on the short list for the T. S. Eliot Prize
 Seamus Heaney: Something to Write Home About, Nicholson and Bass
 Paul Henry, Ingrid's Husband, Seren
 Mimi Khalvati, The Meanest Flower (Carcanet), on the short list for the T. S. Eliot Prize
 Nick Laird, On Purpose (Faber & Faber)
 Frances Leviston, Public Dream (Picador), on the short list for the T. S. Eliot Prize
 Sarah Maguire, The Pomegranates of Kandahar (Chatto), on the short list for the T. S. Eliot Prize
 Edwin Morgan, A Book of Lives (Carcanet), on the short list for the T. S. Eliot Prize
 Daljit Nagra, Look We Have Coming to Dover!, Faber and Faber
 Sean O'Brien, The Drowned Book, Picador, winner of the T. S. Eliot Prize
 Michael O'Neill, The All Sustaining Air: Romantic Legacies and Renewals in British, Irish and American Poetry Since 1900 (scholarship)
 Iona Opie, editor, Mother Goose's Little Treasures, a collection of nursery rhymes
 Maurice Riordan, The Holy Land London: Faber and Faber, Irish poet living in and published in the United Kingdom
 Fiona Sampson, Common Prayer (Carcanet), on the short list for the T. S. Eliot Prize
 Zoë Skoulding, Dark Wires (with Ian Davidson)
 Matthew Sweeney, Black Moon (Jonathan Cape), on the short list for the T. S. Eliot Prize

United States

 Rae Armantrout, Next Life (Wesleyan University Press), one of the New York Times "100 Notable Books of the Year", 92 pages, 
 John Ash, The Parthian Stations (Carcanet), 
 John Ashbery:
 A Worldly Country: New Poems Ecco/HarperCollins, 
 Notes from the Air: Selected Later Poems, Ecco/HarperCollins,  ISBN
 W. H. Auden, Collected Poems, edited by Edward Mendelson (Modern Library) (Anglo-American poet), posthumous
 Mary Jo Bang, Elegy, Graywolf, winner of the National Book Critics Circle Award
 Roger Bonair-Agard, Tarnish and Masquerade (Cypher Books, Rattapallax Press)
 Yosa Buson (1716–1783), Haiku Master Buson, translated from the Japanese by Edith Shiffert and (posthumous) Yuki Sawa, University of Washington Press, ; claimed by the publisher to be "the only translation of the work of this important haiku poet in English"
 Laynie Browne, Daily Sonnets, Counterpath Press
 Charles Bukowski, The Pleasures of the Damned, edited by John Martin, Ecco/HarperCollins
 Kelly Cherry, Hazard and Prospect: New and Selected Poems (Louisiana State University Press), 
 Henri Cole, Blackbird and Wolf (Farrar, Straus and Giroux)
 Jim Daniels, Now Showing (Ahadada Books)
 Edward Dorn:
 Way More West, edited by Michael Rothenberg, Penguin Books  (posthumous)
 Ed Dorn Live: Lectures, Interviews, and Outtakes, edited by Joseph Richey, University of Michigan Press  (posthumous), criticism
 Mark Doty, Dog Years (HarperCollins)
 Michael Dumanis, My Soviet Union, (University of Massachusetts Press, Juniper Prize for Poetry)
 Amy England, Victory and Her Opposites, Tupelo Press
 Aaron Fagan, Garage (Salt Publishing)
 Jessica Fisher, Frail-Craft, foreword by Louise Glück (Yale UP)
 Graham Foust, Necessary Stranger, Flood Editions
 Nikki Giovanni, Acolytes: Poems, William Morrow
 Albert Goldbarth, The Kitchen Sink: New and Selected Poems 1972–2007, Graywolf
 Noah Eli Gordon, Novel Pictorial Noise, HarperCollins
 Mildred White Greear, Moving Gone Dancing (Fall Line Arts Press), 
 Linda Gregerson, Magnetic North (Houghton Mifflin)
 Paul Guest, Notes For My Body Double, University of Nebraska
 Beth Gylys, Matchbook (La Vita Poetica Press), later set to music by Dan Welcher
 Forrest Hamer, Rift (Four Way Books)
 Matthea Harvey, Modern Life, Graywolf, a finalist for the National Book Critics Circle Award
 Robert Hass, Time and Materials: Poems, 1997–2005 (Ecco/Harper-Collins), one of the New York Times "100 Notable Books of the Year"
 Christian Hawkey, Citizen Of, Wave Books
 Brian Henry, The Stripping Point, Counterpath Press
 Zbigniew Herbert, The Collected Poems: 1956–1998 (Ecco), one of the New York Times "100 Notable Books of the Year"
 Bob Hicok, This Clumsy Living, Pittsburgh University Press
 Anselm Hollo, Guests of Space, Coffee House
 Fanny Howe, The Lyrics, Graywolf Press
 Susan Howe, Souls of the Labadie Tract (New Directions)
 Eugen Jebeleanu, Secret Weapon: The Late Poems of Eugen Jebeleanu, translated from Romanian by Matthew Zapruder, (Coffee House)
 Pierre Joris, Meditations on the Stations of Mansour Al-Halla, 1 – 21, (Anchorite Press, Albany, NY)
 James Browning Kepple, Kim Göransson, Couplet (pretend genius [press]) 
 Henia Karmel and Ilona Karmel, A Wall of Two: Poems of Resistance and Suffering from Kraków to Buchenwald and Beyond, adapted by Fanny Howe, University of California Press
 X. J. Kennedy, In a Prominent Bar in Secaucus: New & Selected Poems 1955–2007, Johns Hopkins University Press
 Karl Kirchwey, The Happiness of This World
 Yusef Komunyakaa and Chad Gracia, Gilgamesh: A Verse Play, Wesleyan University Press
 Hiram Larew, More Than Anything (VRZHU Press) 

 James Longenbach, Draft of a Letter (Spring)
 Martial, Martial: The World of the Epigram, translated by William Fitzgerald, University of Chicago Press (posthumous)
 Michael Meyerhofer Leaving Iowa (Briery Creek Press)
 William Michaelian:
 Another Song I Know (Cosmopsis Books) 
 Winter Poems (Cosmopsis Books), 
 Jennifer Moxley The Line (The Post-Apollo Press)
 Ann E. Mullaney, translator, Teofilo Folengo (1491–1544), Baldo, Volume 1, Books I-XII, translated from a blend of Latin and various Italian dialects (Harvard University Press), posthumous
 Laura Mullen, Murmur, Futurepoem Books
 Kate Northrup, Things Are Disappearing Here: Poems Braziller/Persea
 Alice Notley In the Pines (Penguin Books)
 Michael O'Brien, Sleeping and Waking, Flood, a finalist for the National Book Critics Circle Award
 George Oppen, Selected Prose, Daybooks, and Papers (edited by Stephen Cope), University of California Press, 2007 (publication was 2007, but not available until 2008)
 Terry Philips, Oulipoems (Ahadada Books)
 Carl Phillips, Quiver of Arrows: Selected poems (Farrar Straus & Giroux)
 Tom Pickard, The Ballad of Jamie Allan, Flood, a finalist for the National Book Critics Circle Award
 Robert Pinsky, Gulf Music (Farrar, Straus and Giroux),  
 J. E. Pitts The Weather of Dreams  (David Robert Books)
 Meghan O'Rourke, Halflife (Norton)
 Bin Ramke, Tendril, Omnidawn
 Donald Revell, A Thief of Strings, Alice James Books
 Adrienne Rich, Poetry and Commitment (Norton)
 Kim Roberts, The Kimnama (VRZHU Press) 
 Martha Ronk, Vertigo, Coffee House Press
 J. Allyn Rosser, Foiled Again, (Fall) Ivan R. Dee
 Jerome Rothenberg, China Notes & The Treasures of DunHuang (Ahadada Books)
 Tadeusz Rozewicz, New Poems, Archipelago, a finalist for the National Book Critics Circle Award
 Leslie Scalapino, Day Ocean State of Stars' Night: Poems & Writings 1989 & 1999–2006 (Green Integer)
 Grace Schulman, The Broken String
 W. G. Sebald, Unrecounted, New Directions
 David Shapiro, New and Selected Poems, 1965–2006 (Overlook Press)
 Ron Silliman, The Age of Huts (complete) (UC Press)
 Tom Sleigh, Space Walk
 Cathy Song, Cloud Moving Hands, University of Pittsburgh Press
 Rod Smith, Deed (Iowa UP)
 Gary Soto, A Simple Plan
 Mark Strand, New Selected Poems, by a Canadian native long living in and published in the United States
 Cole Swensen, The Glass Age, Alice James Books
 Tony Tost, Complex Sleep (Iowa UP)
 David Trinidad, The Late Show: Poems Turtle Point
 Nance Van Winckel, No Starling, University of Washington Press, 
 Derek Walcott, Selected Poems, edited by Edward Baugh (Faber), one of the New York Times "100 Notable Books of the Year"
 G. C. Waldrep, Disclamor, BOA Editions
 Philip Whalen, The Collected Poems of Philip Whalen, Wesleyan University Press
 John Wieners, A Book of Prophecies (Bootstrap Press
 C. D. Wright, One Big Self: An Investigation, a book-length poem, Copper Canyon
 C. Dale Young, The Second Person (Four Way Books)
 Kevin Young, For the Confederate Dead, (Knopf)

Criticism, scholarship and biography in the United States
 Edward Dorn, Ed Dorn Live: Lectures, Interviews, and Outtakes (University of Michigan Press)
 Robert Faggen, editor, The Notebooks of Robert Frost, Harvard University Press
 Sam Hamill, Avocations: On Poets and Poetry, Red Hen
 James Longenbach, The Art of the Poetic Line, Graywolf Press,  
 Janet Malcolm, Two Lives: Gertrude and Alice, about Gertrude Stein and Alice Toklas (Yale University Press), biography
 Karen Marguerite Moloney, Seamus Heaney and the Emblems of Hope, 
 A. David Moody, Ezra Pound: Poet I: The Young Genius 1885–1920
 Adrienne Rich, Poetry and Commitment: An Essay
 Mark Scroggins, The Poem of a Life: A Biography of Louis Zukofsky

Anthologies in the United States
 Allison Hedge Coke, editor – To Topos/Oregon State University Ahani: Indigenous American Poetry
 Julia Kasdorf and Michael Tyrell, editors, Broken Land: Poems of Brooklyn, anthology (New York University)
 David Lehman, general editor, Heather McHugh, 2007 editor, The Best American Poetry 2007 Scribner 
 Kei Miller, New Caribbean Poetry, including poems by Christian Campbell, Loretta Collins, Delores Gauntlett, Shara McCallum, Marilene Phipps, Jennifer Rahim, Tanya Shirley, and Ian Strachan; Carcanet
 Claudia Rankine and Lisa Sewell, editors, American Poets in the 21st century: The New Poetics, featuring the work of 13 poets: Joshua Clover, Stacy Doris, Peter Gizzi, Kenneth Goldsmith, Myung Mi Kim, Mark Levine, Tracie Morris, Mark Nowak, D.A. Powell, Juliana Spahr, Karen Volkman, Susan Wheeler, and Kevin Young; accompanied by an audio CD of readings from each poet; Wesleyan University Press, 
 Daniel Tobin, editor, The Book of Irish American Poetry: From the Eighteenth Century to the Present, University of Notre Dame Press
 Natasha Trethewey, editor, Jeb Livingood, series editor, Best New Poets 2007: 50 Poems from Emerging Writers (Samovar Press)

Poets in The Best American Poetry 2007
These poets appeared in The Best American Poetry 2007, with David Lehman, general editor, and Heather McHugh, guest editor (who selected the poetry) (Scribner ):

 Kazim Ali
 Jeannette Allee
 Rae Armantrout
 Mary Jo Bang
 Nicky Beer
 Marvin Bell
 Christian Bök
 Louis E. Bourgeois
 Geoffrey Brock
 Matthew Byrne
 MacGregor Card
 Julie Carr
 Michael Collier
 Billy Collins
 Robert Creeley

 Mike Dockins
 Sharon Dolin
 Denise Duhamel
 Stephen Dunn
 Russell Edson
 Elaine Equi
 Landis Everson
 Thomas Fink
 Helen Ransom Forman
 Louise Glück
 Albert Goldbarth
 Donald Hall
 Mark Halliday
 Forrest Hamer

 Matthea Harvey
 Robert Hass
 Jane Hirshfield
 Daniel Johnson
 Richard Kenney
 Milton Kessler
 Galway Kinnell
 David Kirby
 Julie Larios
 Brad Leithauser
 Ben Lerner
 Joanie Mackowski
 Amit Majmudar
 Sabrina Orah Mark

 Campbell McGrath
 Leslie Adrienne Miller
 Marilyn Nelson
 Meghan O'Rourke
 Ed Ochester
 Gregory Orr
 Danielle Pafunda
 Chad Parmenter
 Susan Parr
 Peter Pereira
 Robert Pinsky
 David Rivard
 Marya Rosenberg
 Natasha Sajé

 Frederick Seidel
 Alan Shapiro
 David Shumate
 Carmine Starnino
 Brian Turner
 Arthur Vogelsang
 Cody Walker
 Kary Wayson
 Charles Harper Webb
 Joe Wenderoth
 Richard Wilbur
 George Witte
 Theodor Worozbyt
 Harriet Zinnes

Other in English
 Breyten Breytenbach, Windcatcher: New and Selected Poems, 1964–2006, Harcourt (South African)

Works published in other languages

Bangladesh
  Chandan chowdhury- Crab of Red river. (Lal kakrar nodi); Balaka prakash, Chittagong, Bangladesh. – Bengali poetry

Denmark
 Annette Kure Andersen, Andetsteds ("Elsewhere")
 Thomas Boberg, Gæstebogen ("Guest Book")
 Anne-Louise Bosmans, Villa ("Villa")
 Duna Ghali, En have med duft af mand ("A Garden with the Scent of Man")
 Simon Grotrian:
 Din frelser bliver din klippe ("Your Savior is Your Rock"), psalms
 Tyve sorte kinder ("Twenty Black Cheeks")
 Lone Hørslev, Lige mig ("Me to a T")
 Niels Lyngsø, 39 digte til det brændende bibliotek ("39 Poems for a Burning Library")
 Henrik Nordbrandt, Besøgstid ("Visiting Hours")
 Palle Sigsgaard, Glitrende støv danser ("Glittering Dust Dances"), a short collection
 Peter Christensen Teilmann, Friværdi ("Equity")

French language

France

 Guillaume Apollinaire, Je pense à toi mon Lou ("I Think of You My Lou"), publisher: Textuel; writings published for the first time
 Seyhmus Dagtekin, Juste un pont sans feu, publisher: Le Castor astral
 Emily Dickinson, Car l'adieu, c'est la nuit, translated from the original English by Claire Malroux, based on the Johnson edition; Gallimard/NRF
 Claude Esteban, La Mort à distance ("Death at a Distance"), published posthumously, publisher: Gallimard
 Louise Gaggini, Les Enfants sont la mémoire des hommes ("Children Are the Memory of Men"), publisher: Multitudes, a poetic tale for the benefit of UNICEF
 Jean Grosjean, Arpèges et paraboles, ("Arpège and parables"), publisher: Gallimard
 Abdellatif Laabi, Mon cher double, La Différence, coll. Clepsydre, Paris, Moroccan author writing in French and published in France

Anthologies published in France
 L'Année poétique 2007 ("The Poetry Year 2007"), publisher: Seghers; 125 contemporary poems; anthology
 Jean Orizet, editor, Anthologie de la poésie française ("Anthology of French Poetry"), publisher: Larousse, anthology
 Christian Poslianec, editor, Duos d'amour, ("Love Duets"), publisher: Seghers, anthology of love poems

Canada, in French
 Jacques Allard, editor, Le Bonheur des poètes, publisher: Écrits des Forges, contemporary poetry anthology

German
 Lindita Arapi, Am Meer, nachts, Albanian poet writing in German
 Christoph Buchwald, series editor, 25. Jahrbuch der Lyrik: Die schönsten Gedichte aus 25 Jahren ("25. Yearbook of Poetry: The most beautiful poems from 25 years"); Frankfurt: Fischer (S.), 410 pages, an anthology
 Hendrik Jackson, Im Innern der zerbrechenden Schale. Poetik und Pastichen ("Inside the crumbling shell: Poetics and pastiche"), Kookbooks, 144 pages, ; Germany
 Monika Rinck, with Daniela Seel (editor), and Andrew Potter (narrator), zum fernbleiben der umarmung ("to stay away from the embrace"), 78 pages, Kookbooks, ; Germany
 Ron Winkler, Fragmentierte Gewässer: Gedichte ("Fragmented Waters: Poems"), Berlin Verlag, 83 pages,

Greece
 Katerina Iliopoulou, Mister T., Melani editions
 Patricia Kolaiti, ‘Celesteia, Nefeli Publishing; nominated for the 2008 Diavazo First Book Award
 Karaoke Poetry Bar, Athens: Futura Editions, an anthology

India
In each section, listed in alphabetical order by first name:

Malayalam
 K. G. Sankara Pillai, KGS Kavithakal 1997–2006, Kottayam, Kerala: D C Books
 Raghavan Atholi:
 Kanalormmakal, Calicut: Avvaiyar Books
 Kathunna Mazhakal, Calicut: Mathrubhumi
 Veerankutty, Autograph, Kottayam: DC Books

Other in India
 Gagan Gill, translator, Devadoot Ki Bajay Kuchh Bhi, poems by Zbigniew Herbert, edited and translated into Hindi from the original Polish; Remadhav Publications, New Delhi, 2007
 Mamta Sagar, Hiige HaaLeya Maile HaaDu, Bangalore: Abhinava Prakashana, Kannada-language
 Mithu Sen, Bashmati Sarir Bagan Ba Gaan, (1995–2005), Kolkata: Nandimukh; Bengali-language
 Rituraj, Asha Naam Nadi, Hindi-language

Poland
 Ewa Lipska, Pomarańcza Newtona, ("Newton's Orange"); Kraków: Wydawnictwo literackie
 Tadeusz Różewicz, nauka chodzenia, Wrocław: Biuro Literackie
 Tomasz Różycki, The Forgotten Keys

Spanish language

Latin America
 Roberto Bolaño, La universidad desconocida, his complete poems, a collection he prepared (posthumous), Chile
 Pablo De Santis, El enigma de Paris, Argentina
 Jorge Nájar, El árbol de Sodoma, Peru

Serbia
 Dejan Stojanović, Ples vremena (Dance of Time), Konras, Beograd, 2007

Other languages
 Qaysar Aminpur, Dastur-i zaban-i eshq (“A Grammar of Love”), the best-selling poetry book this year in Iran
 Mahmud Darwish,  ("I Do Not Want This Poem to End"), published posthumously; Arabian, Egypt
 Sheida Mohamadi, Aks-e fowri-ye 'eshq-bazi ("A Snapshot of Love-Making"), a (Los Angeles) United States-based author published this year in Tehran, Iran; Persian
 Suzan 'Ulaywan, Bayt min sukkar, ("A House Made of Sugar"), Arabic

Awards and honors

International
 Nobel Prize in Literature: Doris Lessing, Great Britain
 Golden Wreath of Poetry: Mahmoud Darwish (Palestine)

Australia
 C. J. Dennis Prize for Poetry: Judy Johnson, Jack, Pandanus Press
 Dinny O'Hearn Poetry Prize: The Goldfinches of Baghdad by Robert Adamson
 Kenneth Slessor Prize for Poetry:

Canada
 Archibald Lampman Award: Monty Reid, Disappointment Island
 Atlantic Poetry Prize: Steve McOrmond, Primer on the Hereafter
 Gerald Lampert Award: Steven Price, Anatomy of Keys
 Governor General's Literary Awards: Don Domanski, All Our Wonder Unavenged (English); Serge Patrice Thibodeau, Seul on est (French)
 Griffin Poetry Prize:
 Canada, in the English language: Don McKay, Strike/Slip
 Canada, in the French language: Serge Patrice Thibodeau, Seul on est
 International, in the English Language: Charles Wright, Scar Tissue; and **"Lifetime Recognition Award" (presented by the Griffin trustees) to Tomas Tranströmer
 International shortlist: Paul Farley, Tramp in Flames (Picador); Rodney Jones, Salvation Blues (Houghton Mifflin); Frederick Seidel, Ooga Booga (Farrar, Straus, Giroux)
 Pat Lowther Award: Sina Queyras, Lemon Hound
 Prix Alain-Grandbois: François Charron, Ce qui nous abandonne
 Dorothy Livesay Poetry Prize: Don McKay, Strike/Slip
 Prix Émile-Nelligan: Danny Plourde, calme aurore (s'unir ailleurs, du napalm plein l'œil)

India

New Zealand
 Prime Minister's Awards for Literary Achievement: Dick Scott, Bill Manhire and Fiona Farrell
 Montana New Zealand Book Awards:
 Poetry: Janet Frame, for The Goose Bath
 Jessie Mackay Best First Book of Poetry: Airini Beautrais Secret Heart. Victoria University Press

United Kingdom
 Costa Award (formerly the Whitbread Awards) for poetry : John Haynes (poet), Letter to Patience (Seren, 2006), a book-length poem; (Judges: Elaine Feinstein, Jeremy Noel-Tod and Deryn Rees-Jones)
 Cholmondeley Award :  Judith Kazantzis, Robert Nye, Penelope Shuttle
 David Cohen Prize : Derek Mahon
 Eric Gregory Award :  Rachel Curzon, Miriam Gamble, Michael McKimm, Helen Mort, Jack Underwood
 Forward Poetry Prizes:
 Best collection : Sean O'Brien, for The Drowned Book
 Best first collection : Daljit Nagra, for Look We Have Coming To Dover!
 Best single poem : Alice Oswald, for "Dunt"
 Queen's Gold Medal for Poetry : James Fenton
 National Poetry Competition : Sinead Morrissey for Through the Square Window
 T. S. Eliot Prize : Sean O'Brien for The Drowned Book

United States
 Agnes Lynch Starrett Poetry Prize awarded to Michael McGriff for Dismantling the Hills
 Bollingen Prize: Frank Bidart
 Lenore Marshall Poetry Prize: Alice Notley, for Grave of Light: New and Selected Poems 1970–2005
 Los Angeles Times Book Prize for poetry: Stanley Plumly, Old Heart: Poems (W. W. Norton)
 National Book Award for Poetry: Robert Hass, for Time and Materials
 The New Criterion Poetry Prize: J. Allyn Rosser, for Foiled Again
 Pulitzer Prize for Poetry (United States): Natasha Trethewey, for Native Guard
 Wallace Stevens Award: Charles Simic
 Whiting Awards: Paul Guest, Cate Marvin

From the Poetry Society of America
 Frost Medal: John Hollander
 Shelley Memorial Award: Kimiko Hahn; Judges: Major Jackson, Maurya Simon, and George Stanley
 Writer Magazine/Emily Dickinson Award: James Richardson; Judge: Matthea Harvey
 Cecil Hemley Memorial Award: Yerra Sugarman; Judge: Michael Palmer
 Lyric Poetry Award: Ed Skoog; Judge: Srikanth Reddy
 Lucille Medwick Memorial Award: Wayne Miller; Judge: Tracy K. Smith
 Alice Fay Di Castagnola Award: Rusty Morrison; Judge: Susan Howe
 Louise Louis/Emily F. Bourne Student Poetry Award:  Laura Ruffino; Judge: Thomas Sayers Ellis
 George Bogin Memorial Award: Wayne Miller; Judge: Eleni Sikelianos
 Robert H. Winner Memorial Award: Charlene Fix; finalists: Eva Heisler, Rick Hilles
 Norma Farber First Book Award: Kate Colby, Fruitlands Litmus Press; Judge: Rosmarie Waldrop
 William Carlos Williams Award: Matthew Zapruder, The Pijamaist, Copper Canyon Press; finalists: Liam Rector, Elaine Terranova; Judge: Tony Hoagland

Awards and honors given elsewhere
 Cervantes Prize (Spain): Juan Gelman (Argentina)

Deaths
Birth years link to the corresponding "[year] in poetry" article:
 January 13 – Diké Omeje, English, cancer
 January 19 – Fiama Hasse Pais Brandão (born 1938), Portugal
 February 13 – Elizabeth Jolley, English-born, Australian author, poet and scriptwriter
 February 14 – Emmett Williams, 81, American poet, known for among other reasons, his collaborations with Daniel Spoerri and Claus Bremer in the Darmstadt circle of concrete poetry, dynamic theater, etc., from 1957 to 1959
 February 24 – Julia Casterton, English
 March 19:
 Shimon Tzabar, 80, Israeli artist, author, poet and former Haaretz columnist, pneumonia
 Robert Dickson, 62, Canadian professor, award-winning Franco-Ontarian writer and poet, cancer
 March 20 – Rita Joe, 75, Canadian Mi'kmaq poet, of Parkinson's disease.
 May 25 – Len Roberts, 60, American poet, professor
 May 30 – William M. Meredith, 88, American, poet, professor
 May 31 – Sarah Hannah, 40, American poet, professor
 June 2 – John Moriarty, 69, Irish poet and philosopher
 June 7 –; Michael Hamburger, 83, German poet, translator
 June 20 – Nazik al-Mala'ika, 85, Iraqi poet
 June 21 – Mary Ellen Solt, 86, American poet, critic
 June 11 – Mercer Simpson, 81, Welsh poet, critic and academic writing in English
 June 25 – Rahim al-Maliki, 39, Iraqi poet
 June 27 – Dragutin Tadijanović, 102, Croatian poet
 July 1 – Mộng Tuyết, 93, Vietnamese poet
 July 2:
 Philip Booth, 81, American poet, professor
 Sandy Crimmins, 55, American poet, performance artist
 July 11 – Noel Rowe (born 1951), Australian, poet, writer, academic and Roman Catholic priest in the Marist order
 July 16 – Dmitri Prigov, 66, Russian poet, artist
 July 18 – Sekou Sundiata, 58, American poet, performance artist
 July 31 – Margaret Avison, 89, Canadian poet
 August 15:
 Liam Rector, 57, American poet, professor, critic
 Khalid Alig, 82, Indian poet, journalist
 August 22 – Grace Paley, 84, American poet, short story writer, activist
 August 24 – Robbie Benoit, Canadian cowboy poet and writer
 August 25 – Tarapada Roy (born 1936) Bengali poet, essayist and short-story writer known for his satirical sense of humour
 August 27 – Alberto de Lacerda 78, Portuguese poet
 September 13 – Bill Griffiths, 59, English poet and writer
 October 21 – R. B. Kitaj, 74, American-born artist, a friend of poets, via his portraits of poets Robert Duncan, Robert Creeley, Charles Olson & others
 October 30:
 James Michie (poet), 80 (born 1927), English poet, translator and publisher
 Paul Roche, 91 (born 1916), English poet, translator and academic once associated with the Bloomsbury Group
 November 16 – Vernon Scannell, 85 (born 1922), English poet, novelist and biographer
 November 17? – Landis Everson, 81, American poet, had a loose affiliation with the Berkeley Renaissance via his association with Jack Spicer's circle of poets. Everson's work was "rediscovered" only a few years before his death.
 November 17:
 Siv Cedering, 68, Swedish-American poet, painter, sculptor, illustrator, and author, of pancreatic cancer
 Meg Campbell (born 1937), New Zealand poet and wife of Alistair Campbell
 November 29 – Jaleh Esfahani, 86 (born 1921), in London, Iranian, a woman
 December 16 – Diane Wood Middlebrook, née Helen Diane Wood, 68, (born 1939), American poet, academic and biographer
 December 30 – Rosemary C. Wilkinson, American poet and Honorary President of the World Academy of Arts and Culture (WAAC)
 Also:
 Edith Hannah Campion, New Zealand poet and actress
 Alberto da Cunha Melo, Brazil

References

See also

 List of poetry awards

2000s in poetry

poetry